Vyshata was a Novgorodian general and voivode, whose father is supposed to have been posadnik Ostromir and whose son was Yan Vyshatich. Vyshata was an associate of Vladimir Yaroslavovich while the last ruled in Novgorod. The authors of the Primary Chronicle made use of Yan's tales, tending to emphasise Vyshata's leadership in the Russo-Byzantine war of 1043 at the expense of Ivan Tvorimich, who was most likely the commander-in-chief. After his defeat near Constantinople, Vyshata was taken prisoner and spent three years in confinement in Byzantium. Having returned to Rus he supported Rostislav Vladimirovich's attempt to get the principality of Novgorod and after its failure fled to Tmutarakan where Rostislav became a prince. He is known to have had another son by the name of Putiata.

Vyshata is mentioned as the right-hand man to Sadko, in Onega-Novgorod Bylinas.

References

11th-century Rus' people
People from medieval Novgorod
Russian military leaders
Russian knights